Mathews County Courthouse Square is a national historic district located at Mathews, Mathews County, Virginia.  It encompasses most of the town center of Mathews, which was originally named Westview before the county was created in 1791.  Located centrally in the county, the crossroads community developed as a service center for the surrounding area.  It is also archaeologically sensitive, as the area was a Native American settlement from the Early Woodland phase before it became a colonial settlement.

The district was listed on the National Register of Historic Places in 2017.

See also
National Register of Historic Places listings in Mathews County, Virginia

References

Historic districts on the National Register of Historic Places in Virginia
National Register of Historic Places in Mathews County, Virginia